On Our Selection (titled in the UK as Down On the Farm) is a 1932 comedy based on the Dad and Dave stories by Steele Rudd. These had been turned into a popular play by Bert Bailey and Edmund Duggan in 1912, which formed the basis for the screenplay. Bailey repeats his stage role as Dad Rudd. He also wrote the script with director Ken G. Hall.

The movie was one of the most popular Australian films of all time.

Plot
The movie opens with the title card "bushland symphony", followed by sounds and vision of the Australian bush. The subsequent action involves a series of various subplots centered around a "selection" in South West Queensland owned by Dad Rudd: he owes some money to his rich neighbour, old Carey, who is determined to break Dad financially; his educated daughter Kate is pursued by two men, the poor but devoted Sandy and Carey's villainous son, Jim; one of his workers, Cranky Jack, has a mysterious background; comic visits from a parson and country dentist who removes Dad's tooth; his dim son Dave proposes to his girlfriend, Lily; his other son, Joe, causes slapstick havoc; Dave gets married and moves out with his wife and tries to borrow money from his father; Dad's daughter Sarah is pursued by the high-voiced Billy, who Dad doesn't like; Dad Rudd runs for parliament opposite Carey; and his horse wins a race.

The main story concerns a murder mystery. Jim Carey attempts to blackmail Kate into being with him by lying about what she did in the city, and Sandy knocks him out. Carey later turns up dead and Sandy is suspected of the murder. The Rudds hold a dance and a police officer turns up to arrest Sandy when Cranky Jack confesses he killed Carey because the dead man stole his wife. The film ends with Dad and Mum happily watching the sun come up.

Cast
Bert Bailey as Dad Rudd
Fred MacDonald as Dave Rudd
Alfreda Bevan as Mum Rudd
John McGowan as Maloney
Molly Raynor as Kate Rudd
Dick Fair as Sandy Graham
John Warwick as Jim Carey
Billy Driscoll as Uncle
Lilias Adeson as Lily White
Len Budrick as Old Carey
Bobbie Beaumont as Sarah Rudd
Ossie Wenban as Joe Rudd
Fred Kerry as Cranky Jack
Dorothy Dunckley as Mrs White
Fred Browne as Billy Bearup
Arthur Dodds as parson

Production
The film was the first full-length feature from Cinesound Productions. Ken G. Hall was reluctant to make the film as he thought it was old fashioned but the play had been enormously popular and Stuart Doyle thought an adaptation would be well received.

Most of the cast had appeared in the stage version. Although Bert Bailey was clean shaven and generally wore a fake beard for his stage performances, Hall insisted he grow a real beard for the film version; Bailey did and ended up wearing a beard for the rest of his life.

Bailey was paid £400 and received 60% of the profits.

Shooting took place in mid 1931, partly in a makeshift studio at an ice skating rink in Bondi Junction, with location filming in Castlereagh, Penrith. Crucial to the movie's success was a sound recording system invented by Tasmanian engineer Arthur Smith, which enabled the film to be made without having to hire sound equipment from Hollywood. (The equipment cost £2,000 – to have imported it would have cost ten times that.) Hall later said Smith's contribution was so important "there would have been no Cinesound without him".

The cinematographer, Walter Sully, was a newsreel cameraman for Cinesound. It was the only feature he made for that company as he soon left to go work for their competitor, Fox Movietone.

Reception
On Our Selection was an enormous success at the box office, being among the top four most popular films in Australian cinemas in 1932 had earned earning £46,000 in Australia and New Zealand by the end of 1933. By the end of 1934 the film had made an estimated profit of £23,200 and Bailey had earned an estimate £14,000. This was a record for Australian films.

On Our Selection was continually revived over the next two decades and by 1953 had earned an estimated £60,000. The profits were split 50-50 between Cinesound Productions and the theatrical partnership of Bert Bailey and James Grant. (In 1938 Hall estimated that 70% of the film's income had been earned in country regions.)

The movie was bought for release in the UK by Universal for £1,000 and was retitled Down on the Farm on the grounds that the British would not know what a "selection" was. Critical response was poor, the Era claiming that "Australia's idea of what constitutes good comedy an obvious caricature of a typical bush homestead, is only likely to please an unsophisticated audience over here." It achieved 500 bookings throughout the country.

Legacy
The movie launched Hall's career as a director and led to three sequels, starting with Grandad Rudd (1935). All the sequels featured Bert Bailey as Dad and Fred MacDonald as Dave, but a variety of actors would play Mum and their other children.

See also
Grandad Rudd (1935)
Dad and Dave Come to Town (1938)
Dad Rudd, MP (1940)

References

External links

On Our Selection at Australian Screen Online
On Our Selection at Oz Movies
Review of film at Variety
On Our Selection by Steele Rudd at Project Gutenberg

1932 films
Films based on works by Steele Rudd
Films directed by Ken G. Hall
Australian comedy films
Australian black-and-white films
Cinesound Productions films
1932 comedy films
1930s Australian films
1930s English-language films